Eugene Claude Harmon Sr. (July 14, 1916 – July 23, 1989) was an American professional golfer and golf instructor.

Born in Savannah, Georgia, Harmon spent much of his boyhood in Florida, in the Orlando area. A youthful prodigy, he qualified for the U.S. Amateur at age 15 in 1931. Harmon was a club professional when he won the 1948 Masters Tournament by five shots to earn $2,500.  He was a semi-finalist three times in the PGA Championship (1945, 1948,  and 1953), competing as a club pro against full-time tour players. Claude Harmon also finished in third place at the 1959 U.S. Open, which was held at his home course at Winged Foot.

From 1945 to 1978, Harmon was the head professional at Winged Foot Golf Club in Mamaroneck, New York, and also served as the winter professional for many years at the Seminole Golf Club in Juno Beach, Florida. In 1959, he was hired as the head professional at Thunderbird Country Club in Rancho Mirage, California, where he served for over a decade, and finally took a club job in Texas in the Houston area. In 1959, Harmon played in the U.S. Open at Winged Foot and placed third. He was one of the few close friends of legendary star Ben Hogan, and the two played together frequently and worked together on their games.

Death
Harmon died of heart failure following surgery in Houston at the age 73, and is interred at Desert Memorial Park in Cathedral City, California. He is a member of the World Golf Teachers' Hall of Fame and the PGA of America Hall of Fame.

Personal
Harmon's sons Claude, Jr. (Butch), Craig, and Bill all occupy spots in Golf Digests "top 50 teachers" list. His third eldest son Dick (1947–2006) was also a top golf instructor, as is grandson Claude Harmon III.

Professional wins (15)

PGA Tour wins (2)
 1948 Masters Tournament
 1950 Miami International Four-Ball (with Pete Cooper)

Major championship is shown in bold.

Other wins (13)
this list may be incomplete
 1946 Westchester Open, Metropolitan PGA Championship
 1947 Westchester Open
 1948 Westchester PGA Championship
 1949 Westchester PGA Championship, Havana Invitational
 1950 Westchester Open
 1951 Westchester Open, Metropolitan PGA Championship, Metropolitan Open
 1953 Westchester Open
 1958 Westchester PGA Championship
 1960 Westchester Open

Major championships

Wins (1)

Results timeline

NT = no tournament
WD = withdrew
DQ = disqualified
CUT = missed the half-way cut
R64, R32, R16, QF, SF = Round in which player lost in PGA Championship match play
"T" indicates a tie for a place

Summary

 Most consecutive cuts made – 12 (1948 Open Championship – 1953 Masters)
 Longest streak of top-10s – 2 (twice)

References

 "Claude Harmon", Almanac of Famous People, 8th ed. Gale Group, 2003.

External links
 
 PGA of America Hall of Fame

American male golfers
PGA Tour golfers
Winners of men's major golf championships
Golfers from Savannah, Georgia
Golfers from Florida
Golfers from New York (state)
Golfers from California
Golfers from Texas
Burials at Desert Memorial Park
Sportspeople from New Rochelle, New York
1916 births
1989 deaths